This a list of notable Mayors of Shrewsbury, the county town of the county of Shropshire, England, since the first recorded mayoralty in 1638. Prior to 1638 the leading citizens of the borough were the two Bailiffs. From 1974 to 2009 the position had the title Mayor of Shrewsbury and Atcham.

Notable Mayors of Shrewsbury
Source: Shrewsbury Town Council
 1638-39 Thomas Jones (1st Mayor of Shrewsbury)
 1657-58 Thomas Hunt (MP for Shrewsbury, 1645–53)
 1685-86 Sir Francis Edwardes, 1st Baronet (MP for Shrewsbury, 1685–89; died on service in Ireland, 1690)
 1696-97 John Kynaston (High Sheriff of Shropshire, 1689–90; MP for Shrewsbury, 1694–1709)
 1726-27 John Adams (1677-1752) (father of William Adams (Master of Pembroke))
 1737-38 Robert More (MP for Shrewsbury, 1754–61)
 1762-63 Robert Clive (Clive of India; MP for Shrewsbury, 1761–1774)
 1775-76 William Owen, (Captain (Royal Navy); founder of Campobello colony in New Brunswick, Canada; killed in India, 1778.  Possibly Shrewsbury's first disabled Mayor, having lost an arm in 1760.)
 1777-78 Charlton Leighton (later Sir Charlton, 4th Baronet) (MP for Shrewsbury 1777 and 1780–84)
 1778-79 Noel Hill, 1st Baron Berwick (MP for Shrewsbury, 1768–74 and for Shropshire, 1774–84)
 1806-07 Sir Baldwin Leighton, 6th Baronet (General of the British Army)
 1807-08 Charles Bage (Wine Merchant)
 1809-10 Joseph Bromfield (Architect)
 1811-12 Sir John Hill, 3rd Baronet (MP for Shrewsbury, 1784–96 and 1805)
 1819-20 Rev Hugh Owen (Clergyman and topographer)
 1824-25 Hon and Rev Richard Hill (later 4th Baron Berwick) (Rector of Berrington, Shropshire)
 1835 (part year) Robert Burton (Banker, head of Salop Bank)
 1835-36 William Hazledine (Ironmaster)
 1836-37 Sir John Bickerton Williams (Nonconformist historian and first knight made by Queen Victoria)
 1842-43 Edward Haycock (Architect)
 1843-44 Robert Burton
 1861-62 William James Clement (Surgeon and MP for Shrewsbury, 1865–70)
 1872-73 Samuel Pountney Smith (Architect)
 1886-87 George Butler Lloyd (Banker, MP for Shrewsbury, 1913–22)
 1887	Vincent Crump	Confectioner
 1888	Major General The Hon. William Henry Herbert (son of Edward Herbert, 2nd Earl of Powis Gentleman
 1889	George Jones Holt	Wine Merchant
 1890	Edmund Cresswell Peele	Solicitor
 1891	George Evans	Gentleman - Retired Businessman - plumber
 1892	William Lyon Browne	Gentleman
 1893	William Gowen Cross	Chemist
 1894	William Maynard How	Solicitor
 1895	Edmund Cresswell Peele	Solicitor
 1896	Edward Corbett	Army Officer
 1897	Thomas Pidduck Deakin, Hotel Proprietor
 1898	Richard Scoltock Hughes, Shoemaker
 1899-1900 Richard Scoltock Hughes, Shoemaker
 1900-02 Samuel Meeson Morris	Solicitor (two terms?)
 1902-03 Herbert Robert Henry Southam, Brewer (Conservative)
 1903-04 William Francis Watkins, Tailor
 1904-05 Henry John Hearn, Brewer
 1905-06 Richard Edward Jones, Maltster

21st century
 1999-2000 Reginald Jones (Retired bus driver, lifelong Shrewsbury resident)
 2000-01 John Peter Jones (Head Teacher (Special Education))
 2001-02 Charles Forshaw (Retired)
 2002-03 George Henry Mills Richey (Lt Col Retired)
 2003-04 Eileen Dorothy Sandford (Retired)
 2004-05 Miles Kenny (Property Manager)
 2005-06 David Farmer 
 2006-07 Roger Evans (Retired)
 2007-08 John Cooke (Farmer)
 2008-09 Anne Chebsey (Biomedical Scientist)
 2009-10 Alan Townsend (Retired Teacher)
 2010-11 Kathleen Owen
 2011-12 Tony Durnell (Shropshire & Shrewsbury Town Councillor)
 2012-13 Keith Roberts (Retired Police Officer)
 2013-14 Jon Tandy (Former Post Office Worker)
 2014-15 Beverley Baker (Costume and accessory designer)
 2015–16 Miles Kenny
 2016–17 Ioan Jones
 2017–18 Jane Mackenzie
 2018–19 Peter Nutting
 2019-20 Phil Gillam
 2020-21 Gwen Burgess
 2021-22 Julian Dean

References

Shropshire-related lists
Shrewsbury
Mayors